Rahimabad (also Romanized as Raḩīmābād; also known as Sheyţānābād) is a village in Baranduzchay-ye Jonubi Rural District, in the Central District of Urmia County, West Azerbaijan Province, Iran. At the 2006 census, its population was 145, in 25 families.

References 

Populated places in Urmia County